Xenosapien is the fifth full-length album by Cephalic Carnage. It was released on May 28, 2007, on Relapse Records. "Endless Cycle of Violence" is the first single, and is available on the band's MySpace page. The album has received strong reviews, and peaked at #13 on the Billboard Heatseekers chart. Xenosapien was recorded from December 2006 to February 2007.

The album was released on CD and 12" vinyl format. The vinyl edition was limited to 1000 copies.

Track listing

Personnel

Cephalic Carnage
Lenzig Leal – vocals
Zac Joe – guitar
John Merryman – drums
Steve Goldberg – guitar
Nick Schendzielos – bass, vocals

Additional musicians
Bruce Lamont (Yakuza) – vocals, saxophone ("G.lobal O.verhaul D.evice")

Production
 Dave Otero – production
 Orion Landau – cover art

References

External links
 Cephalic Carnage on Myspace

Cephalic Carnage albums
2007 albums
Relapse Records albums